Jack Barrett may refer to:

 Jack Barrett (footballer) (1874–1934), English footballer who played for Southampton
 Jack Barrett (hurler) (1910–1979), Irish sportsman
 Jack Barrett (cricketer) (1866–1916), Australian cricketer
 Jack Barrett (politician), Irish politician

See also
 John Barrett (disambiguation)